Because of the Times is the third studio album by American rock band Kings of Leon. It was released on April 2, 2007, in the United Kingdom and the next day in the United States. The album received generally positive reviews and appeared in numerous Top-10 lists for "Album of the Year. In 2009, Clash named the album number 3 on the "Clash Essential 50", a list of the most important albums released since the magazine's inception in 2004.

Reception

Writing for NME, Barry Nicolson said the album "cements Kings Of Leon as one of the great American bands of our times". Entertainment Weekly called Because of the Times "an epic wide-screen movie of a CD and the band's best to date." Another reviewer described Because of the Times as "an accomplished album of unbelievable beauty and familiar, loveable grit. Kings of Leon is maturing wonderfully and with patience, not forcing anything musically or lyrically that doesn't sound natural."

Some critics found the album inferior to the band's previous efforts. Dave Hood of Artrocker gave the album one star out of five, finding that "Kings of Leon are experimenting, learning, and getting a bit lost." Pitchfork contended that "Because of the Times sound[s] suspiciously like a counterattack on womankind, launched from somewhere in the mid-1990s, deep inside a bruised, stadium-sized ego."

The album was ranked #6 on NMEs list of the best albums of the year and #31 on Rolling Stones Top 50 Albums of 2007 list.

Track listing

Personnel
 Caleb Followill – guitar, vocals
 Matthew Followill – guitar, background vocals
 Jared Followill – bass guitar, background vocals
 Nathan Followill – drums, background vocals

Charts and certifications

Weekly charts

Year-end charts

Certifications

References

2007 albums
Kings of Leon albums
RCA Records albums
Albums produced by Ethan Johns
Albums recorded at Sunset Sound Recorders